JoJo Domann (born July 28, 1997) is an American football linebacker for the Indianapolis Colts of the National Football League (NFL). He played college football at Nebraska.

High school career
Domann attended Pine Creek High School in Colorado Springs, Colorado. He played wide receiver and safety in high school. As a senior in 2015, he was the Gatorade Football Player of the Year for Colorado. He committed to the University of Nebraska to play college football.

College career
Domann played at Nebraska for five seasons from 2016 to 2021. He played linebacker and safety. During his career he had 207 total tackles (solo and assisted), 5.5 sacks and two interceptions.

Professional career

Domann signed with the Indianapolis Colts as an undrafted free agent on May 13, 2022. He was one of 3 undrafted free agents to make the final roster, along with cornerback Dallis Flowers and center Wesley French.

Personal life
When the NCAA approved the Name, Image and Likeness policy on June 30, 2021, Domann was quick to act and hosted the first Husker college player-led football camp for the youth. On July 17th, 2021, The first annual Stille and Domann Youth Football Camp took place and had about 150 participants. Drills were conducted mainly by current Husker football players, and the speed portion of the camp was led by Husker All-American sprinter Levi Gipson.

Domann dates long-time girlfriend and former Nebraska Scarlett dancer Megan Wardyn.

References

External links
Nebraska Cornhuskers bio
Indianapolis Colts bio

1997 births
Living people
Players of American football from Colorado Springs, Colorado
American football linebackers
American football safeties
Nebraska Cornhuskers football players
Indianapolis Colts players